Kızımın Kanı is a 1987 Turkish adventure film, directed by Halit Refiğ and starring Tarik Akan, Mine Baysan, and Neslihan Acar.

Cast 
 Tarık Akan
 Mine Baysan
 Neslihan Acar 
 Kaya Sensev 
 Ayşegül Ünsal 
 Yüksel Gözen 
 Şehriban Emirli
 Yavuz Karakaş
 Atilla Kunt
 Yusuf Çetin
 Esval Ayral
 Bülent Polat
 Cansu Açıkoğlu
 Mürüvet Coşkun
 İsmail Kısak
 Süheyl Eğriboz
 Hasan Saraç
 Nejat Gürçen
 Mesut Sürmeli
 Necmi Öney
 Ahmet Canseven

References

External links
Kızımın Kanı at the Internet Movie Database

1987 films
Turkish films about revenge
Turkish adventure drama films
1980s adventure drama films
Films directed by Halit Refiğ